Mitral facies refers to a distinctive facial appearance associated with mitral stenosis.

Someone with mitral stenosis may present with rosy cheeks, whilst the rest of the face has a bluish tinge due to cyanosis. This is especially so in severe mitral stenosis. As low cardiac output in mitral stenosis produces vasoconstriction, peripheral cyanosis is often seen in lips, tip of nose and cheeks. Occasionally along with these, malar flush is seen due to vasodilation (vascular stasis) in malar area.

References
http://www.merckmanuals.com/professional/cardiovascular_disorders/valvular_disorders/mitral_stenosis.html

Medical signs

eu:Fazies (medikuntza)